Gary Lee Sandy (born December 25, 1945) is an American actor. He is best known for playing program director Andy Travis on the television sitcom WKRP in Cincinnati (1978-1982).

Early life and education
Sandy was born in Dayton, Ohio, the son of Austin and Dolores Sandy. He attended Fairmont High School in Kettering, Ohio, and lived in Moraine, Ohio. He later attended Wilmington College in Wilmington, Ohio, and the American Academy of Dramatic Arts in New York City.

Television 
Sandy's early TV career included appearances on several soap operas in the early 1970s, and a number of appearances as a guest on shows including Medical Center, Barnaby Jones, and Starsky & Hutch.

Sandy's most notable role was as Andy Travis, the new program director at a struggling radio station on the CBS sitcom WKRP in Cincinnati. The idea for the show was based on the real experiences of several people who had worked in the industry, including creator Hugh Wilson.

Theater 
In 1982, he replaced Kevin Kline as The Pirate King on Broadway in The Pirates of Penzance.  In 1986, he replaced Tony Roberts as Mortimer Brewster in the fiftieth anniversary production of Arsenic and Old Lace opposite Jean Stapleton and Marion Ross, and continued the role in the North American tour.  Beginning in 2001, he starred opposite Ann-Margret in a stage production of The Best Little Whorehouse in Texas, which toured for two years.

He continues to perform in regional theater and has performed such roles as Elliot Garfield in The Goodbye Girl and Mike Hammer.  He has said that it bothers him being known for a '70s TV show.

References

External links
 
 
 

1945 births
American male film actors
American male soap opera actors
American male stage actors
American male television actors
Living people
Male actors from Dayton, Ohio
Wilmington College (Ohio) alumni
20th-century American male actors
21st-century American male actors
American Academy of Dramatic Arts alumni
People from Montgomery County, Ohio